Carlos Ramirez-Rosa (born February 18, 1989) is an American politician. He has served as the alderman for Chicago's 35th Ward since May 18, 2015.

He is a member of the Chicago City Council's Progressive Reform Caucus, and was elected to serve as a delegate to the 2016 Democratic National Convention as a Bernie Sanders supporter. He served as an Illinois State Vice-Chair for Bernie Sanders' 2020 presidential campaign. Elected at the age of 26 to the Chicago City Council in February 2015, he is the city's youngest alderman, and one of the youngest Aldermen ever elected.

He is a self-described democratic socialist and a member of the Democratic Socialists of America. He joined the Democratic Socialists of America in March 2017.

Early life, education, and career 
Ramirez-Rosa was born on February 18, 1989, in Chicago, Illinois.  He attended Chicago Public Schools and graduated from Whitney M. Young Magnet High School, where he was his senior class president.  He then attended the University of Illinois at Urbana–Champaign,  where he was an elected member of the Illinois Student Senate.  As an elected student senator, he supported funding for women and LGBT student programs, campus green energy policies, and fair treatment of university employees. He graduated from the University of Illinois in 2011.

After graduating, he served as a congressional caseworker in the office of Congressman Luis Gutiérrez. After working for Congressman Gutiérrez, he worked as a family support network organizer with the Illinois Coalition for Immigrant and Refugee Rights until he ran for alderman in 2015.

On April 8, 2014, Ramirez-Rosa was arrested while attempting to block a deportation bus leaving Broadview Detention Center in Broadview, Illinois. The arrest was part of the "Not One More" campaign to pressure President Barack Obama to stop deportations. Ramirez-Rosa said at the time of his arrest: "I'm a U.S. citizen. I don’t fear deportation, but I know that when you're taking hard-working and decent people, putting them in detention centers and then putting them on buses and separating them from their families, that is an act of injustice."

Prior to his election to the Chicago City Council, Ramirez-Rosa also served as an elected community representative to the Avondale-Logandale Local School Council.

He is the nephew of Cook County Judge Ramon Ocasio III. Ramirez-Rosa's mother is of Mexican descent and his father is of Puerto Rican descent.

Chicago City Council 

Ramirez-Rosa was first elected the alderman of the 35th ward on February 24, 2015. He received 67% of the vote, defeating incumbent alderman Rey Colón. He was easily re-elected to a second four-year term on February 28, 2019.

He is a member of the Chicago City Council's Progressive Reform Caucus, Latino Caucus, and the LGBT Caucus.

He is the youngest current alderman and one of the youngest aldermen in the history of Chicago, and one of the city's first two openly LGBT Latino councillors alongside colleague Raymond Lopez. After a year as alderman, Crain's Chicago Business distinguished Ramirez-Rosa as a member of their 2016 "Twenty in their 20s" class.

During his tenure, Ramirez-Rosa has championed housing affordability, property tax relief, immigrant rights, workers' rights, environmental protections, police accountability reform, and other progressive and liberal issues.

City budget and property tax rebate 
In 2015, Ramirez-Rosa opposed Mayor Rahm Emanuel’s record $589 million property tax increase, arguing that the city should have "emptied out hundreds of millions in TIF funds before raising property taxes and fees on Chicago's working families." Ramirez-Rosa voted no on Mayor Emanuel's 2016 budget proposal and property tax increase. After the property tax increase passed, Ramirez-Rosa proposed a $35 million property tax rebate for struggling homeowners. Ultimately, Ramirez-Rosa joined with Mayor Rahm Emanuel to sponsor and pass a $21 million property tax rebate program. Ramirez-Rosa said of the compromise: "this proposal ensures that the poorest homeowners who see the largest property-tax increase get the maximum rebate."

In November 2019, Ramirez-Rosa was one of eleven aldermen to vote against Mayor Lori Lightfoot's first budget. He joined all five other members of the Socialist Caucus in signing a letter to Lightfoot which criticized her budget for "an over-reliance on property taxes" and "regressive funding models" that are "burdensome to our working-class citizens, while giving the wealthy and large corporations a pass."

Chicago Immigration Policy Working Group 
In August 2015, Ramirez-Rosa was a founding member of the Chicago Immigration Policy Working Group. Ramirez-Rosa and the working group successfully pushed the City of Chicago to provide free or low-cost legal assistance to Chicagoans facing deportation, provide support for DACA applicants, expand language access, and create a municipal ID. In 2021, Ramirez-Rosa and the working group succeeded in removing the carveouts from Chicago's sanctuary city ordinance, ensuring the Chicago Police Department could not work with Immigration and Customs Enforcement in any case. Ramirez-Rosa co-sponsored the successful measure alongside Mayor Lori Lightfoot. He first introduced the measure to remove the carveouts in 2017.

Affordable housing and development 
Ramirez-Rosa has supported the development of a number of affordable housing projects in his ward. He championed the construction of a 100-unit, all-affordable transit-oriented development to replace a city-owned parking lot next to the Logan Square Blue Line station. In Albany Park, he supported the construction of a 48-unit, all-affordable development called the "Oso Apartments." After a fire destroyed the sole public library in his ward, he supported rebuilding the library on a new site where it would be co-located with affordable housing.

In addition to supporting affordable housing, Ramirez-Rosa has advocated for rent control, and other policies to stabilize housing and address displacement. In 2021, he sponsored successful ordinances to establish minimum density requirements, and a demolition impact fee for portions of his ward facing high displacement. Ramirez-Rosa argued these ordinances would help preserve naturally-occurring affordable housing.

In 2020, Ramirez-Rosa supported the legalization of accessory dwelling units in much of his ward. He has supported historic preservationist efforts in his district, including the allocation of $250,000 in public landmark funds to help restore Logan Square's Minnekirken.

Ramirez-Rosa supported a major overhaul of Milwaukee Avenue and the Logan Square traffic circle to improve pedestrian and traffic safety. In November 2018, He supported the creation of the First Nations Garden on a large city-owned lot in his ward. The First Nations Garden was created by American Indian youth as a place to heal and connect back to nature. The garden was inaugurated with a land acknowledgement ceremony that included a Chicago City Council resolution passed by Ramirez-Rosa that acknowledged Chicago as an "indigenous landscape."

Participatory democracy 
Ramirez-Rosa has consistently expressed his belief in participatory democracy as central to his work as a democratic socialist elected official. In 2017, he told The Nation Magazine: "I’m a big believer that we can build socialism from below. We need to create these opportunities for working people to hold the reins of power and govern themselves." Likewise, in 2017, he told Jacobin magazine: "democratic socialism means that the people govern every facet of their lives, whether it be the economic structure or the government that’s determining the policies that impact their lives."

In 2019, Ramirez-Rosa explained to writer Micah Uetricht how he seeks to put participatory democracy into action in his elected office: "In the thirty-fifth ward we have what we call 'people-power initiatives.' To date, those are three programs that we run through my office. They seek to show people’s ability to govern themselves and collectively come to together and make decisions. We don’t need the Donald Trumps of the world, the Jeff Bezoses of the world... telling us what our communities should look like or how we should live our lives. We collectively, from the grassroots, from below, can determine our own destiny."

The three "people-power initiatives" Ramirez-Rosa supports through his elected office are "community-driven zoning and development" - a local participatory planning process, participatory budgeting for the allocation of infrastructure improvement dollars, and a local rapid-response deportation defense network called the "community defense committee." The "community defense committee" distributes immigration know-your-rights cards door-to-door, organizers know-your-rights trainings, and trains ward residents in how to engage in civil disobedience to stop deportations.

Ramirez-Rosa has also called himself a "movement elected official," stating his "role is to be an organizer on the inside for those movements that are organizing people-power bases on the outside."

Police reform and No Cop Academy campaign 
In 2016, Ramirez-Rosa worked with the Chicago Alliance Against Racist and Political Repression to introduce the Chicago Police Accountability Council ordinance. The ordinance would enact civilian oversight of the Chicago Police Department via an all-elected civilian body. Ramirez-Rosa said the ordinance "could be a model for true police accountability reform across the country."

In December 2017, Ramirez-Rosa was the sole member of the Chicago City Council to support the No Cop Academy campaign, a grassroots abolitionist effort to stop the city from spending $95 million on a new police academy building and instead spend that money on education, after school programs, job training, and social services. Ramirez-Rosa would explain his support of the No Cop Academy campaign as follows: "police violence has cost Chicagoans $662 million in settlements since 2004, and CPD is funded to a tune of $4 million per day, $1.5 billion per year. Our nation has witnessed the magnitude of police crimes in the City of Chicago with the murders of Rekia Boyd and Laquan McDonald. The Chicago Police Department is not lacking in resources, it is lacking in accountability and oversight. The $95 million that the City is projected to spend on this new cop academy should be invested in jobs, education, youth programs, and mental health services, not a new shooting range and swimming pool for police.”

In May 2018, after successfully delaying a vote on the new police academy, Ramirez-Rosa was expelled from the Chicago City Council's Latino Caucus. Ramirez-Rosa was later readmitted to the Latino Caucus after public outcry.

In 2020, in the wake of George Floyd protests, Ramirez-Rosa helped dozens of Black Lives Matter protesters recover their bikes which had been confiscated by the Chicago Police.

Pandemic response 
In 2020, in response to the COVID-19 pandemic, Ramirez-Rosa used his aldermanic office's resources to initiate and support neighborhood mutual aid networks, and to target support to communities most impacted by the pandemic. Ramirez-Rosa's office distributed a bilingual newsletter to 7,000 ward households to provide residents with information on unemployment insurance and resources available to support them during the pandemic. Ramirez-Rosa joined with his socialist colleagues to call for a pandemic response that prioritized "the most vulnerable." He also worked to expand Chicago's emergency rental assistance to undocumented Chicagoans. In December 2020, he helped bring the One Fair Wage High Road Kitchens program to Chicago, which provided grants to restaurants who committed to transition to a full minimum wage with tips on top.

Workers' rights 
Ramirez-Rosa has advocated for the raising of Chicago's minimum wage to a living wage, and other measures in support of workers' rights. He was a sponsor of the successful Fair Workweek ordinance to provide hourly-workers with stability in their work schedules. He also sponsored the ordinance to raise Chicago's minimum wage to $15. Ramirez-Rosa also worked to create a municipal Office of Labor Standards to protect Chicago workers.

On October 4, 2018, Ramirez-Rosa was arrested at a Fight for $15 protest outside McDonald's global headquarters in the West Loop. He was arrested alongside striking workers as they blocked the entrance to the building in an act of civil disobedience. The McDonald's workers were demanding a $15 wage and a union. Ramirez-Rosa has spoken at several Fight for $15 demonstrations.

In 2017, Ramirez-Rosa sponsored and passed an ordinance to designate Kedzie Avenue in his ward as "Lucy Gonzalez Parsons Way," in honor of the late labor organizer and founder of the IWW union. Parsons lived off Kedzie Avenue at 3130 N. Troy. At an honorary street sign unveiling event held on May 1, 2017, International Workers' Day, Ramirez-Rosa said: "The conditions Lucy and other workers were facing... are not too different from the conditions we're facing now. Today we honor Lucy Gonzalez Parsons because she taught us the way, she taught us that you don't take it sitting down, you don't live on your knees, you rise up and you fight back."

LGBT rights 
In 2016, Ramirez-Rosa sponsored a successful measure to ensure transgender persons had the right to access the public bathroom of their choice. During City Council debate on the ordinance, Ramirez-Rosa said: "We must do everything we can to legislate love and to reject hate... we can legislate love because we can show that as a city, we will not discriminate against our trans-sisters and brothers, that we will allow equality to reign supreme when it comes to access to public accommodations.”

Electoral history

Aldermanic elections

Democratic committeeman 
Ramirez-Rosa served as 35th Ward Democratic Committeeman from 2016 to 2020. In 2019, he supported Anthony Joel Quezada to replace him as Democratic Committeeman in the March 2020 primary election.

Campaigns for higher office
Daniel Biss's selected Ramirez-Rosa as his running mate in the 2018 Illinois gubernatorial election on August 31, 2017. Only six days later Biss dropped him from the ticket after his ally Brad Schneider rescinded his endorsement due to Ramirez-Rosa's support of the BDS Movement. The BDS Movement seeks to impose comprehensive boycotts of Israel until it ends documented human rights violations against the Palestinians.

After Luis Gutiérrez announced his retirement from Congress, Ramirez-Rosa announced his candidacy for Gutiérrez's seat, Illinois's 4th congressional district. Ramirez-Rosa withdrew on January 9, 2018, and endorsed Jesus "Chuy" Garcia that same day, citing his desire to not split the progressive vote in the Democratic primary.

See also
 Chicago aldermanic elections, 2015
 Chicago City Council
 List of Democratic Socialists of America who have held office in the United States

Footnotes

Further reading

 Micah Uetricht, "Carlos Rosa's Political Capital: An Interview with Carlos Ramirez-Rosa," Jacobin, September 2017.
 Ben Joravsky "Why did Carlos Ramirez-Rosa get kicked out of the City Council’s Latino Caucus?" Chicago Reader May 2018.

External links 
 Political Website of Carlos Rosa
 DNAinfo Profile of Alderman-Elect Carlos Rosa
 https://web.archive.org/web/20170616123957/http://www.chicagodsa.org/page9.html

1989 births
21st-century American politicians
Chicago City Council members
Hispanic and Latino American politicians
Gay politicians
LGBT Hispanic and Latino American people
American LGBT city council members
LGBT people from Illinois
Living people
Democratic Socialists of America politicians from Illinois
University of Illinois Urbana-Champaign alumni
Mexican-American people in Illinois politics
Puerto Rican people in Illinois politics
Illinois socialists
21st-century LGBT people